Keppetipola (කැප්පෙටිපොල) is a town in Sri Lanka. It is located in Badulla District of Uva Province, Sri Lanka. During the British period this village had been called as Wilson-Tenna. In 1818 the  British General named Wilson destroyed and abandoned this arid. Then this was called Palugama. And later somewhere in 1968 this had been named as Keppetipola. This had been done in honour and to commemorate the action of Monarawila keppetipola's ( then Disawa of Uva under the British )  return of the British troops and Armour and joining and taking the leadership of the 1818 rebellion against the British.

Government institutions
 Uva Office of the Keppetipola Co-operative Society
 Keppetipola Economic Center
 CTB Bus Depot	
 CTB Workshop
 State Timber Corporation - Timber Depot
 Irrigation Department - Engineering office

Places of interest
Ancient Dagoba at Sri Somananda Pirivena.
Ancient fortress.

See also
Towns in Uva
History of Uva Province
Monarawila Keppetipola Disawe

References

External links
Keppetipola Disawa
Keppetipola Nil Beans

Populated places in Badulla District
Populated places in Uva Province